VLDLR-associated cerebellar hypoplasia (VLDLRCH) is a rare autosomal recessive condition caused by a disruption of the VLDLR gene. First described as a form of cerebral palsy in the 1970s, it is associated with parental consanguinity and is found in secluded communities, with a number of cases described in Hutterite families.

References

External links 

GeneReviews/NCBI/NIH/UW entry on VLDLR-associated cerebellar hypoplasia

Congenital disorders of nervous system